Blood guilt or Bloodguilt may refer to:
any unlawful killing, see manslaughter
murder
any crime severe enough to be punished by the death penalty
crimes falling under high justice in feudal Europe

See also
Weregild (blood money), paid in atonement for blood guilt
Blood court (Blutgericht), legal term for "high justice" in the Holy Roman Empire
Homicide
Bloodguilt in the Hebrew Bible